Le Jardin du Luxembourg is the 10th studio album by French singer Joe Dassin. It came out in 1976 on CBS Disques.

Commercial performance 
The album reached at least the top 6 in France and at least the top 8 in Greece (according to the charts, courtesy respectively of the Centre d'Information et de Documentation du Disque and of Lefty Kongalides, that U.S. Billboard published in its "Hits of the World" section).

At a big gala in Wavre, Belgium, in late 1977 Joe Dassin received gold disks for this album and for one of his several albums titled Joe Dassin.

Also, U.S. Billboard wrote in its 24 December 1977 issue that according to CBS Le Jardin du Luxembourg and another Joe Dassin album, titled Joe Dassin, were among the company's best selling albums over the past month.

On April 19, 1995, the album was certified Double Gold by the French Syndicat National de l'Édition Phonographique.

Track listing

References 

Joe Dassin albums
1976 albums
Columbia Records albums
Albums produced by Jacques Plait